In 1989, a group of ten wood carvers, with the common goal of promoting the art of caricature carving, met in the back room of Paxton Lumber Co. in Fort Worth, Texas to discuss the formation of a national organization to further that goal. From that meeting came the Caricature Carvers of America (CCA). The founding group consisted of fifteen nationally recognized wood carvers representing a broad geographical distribution as well as diverse styles of caricature carving. Since the inception of the CCA, two members have resigned, four have converted their membership to "emeritus" status, three are deceased, and eighteen new members have been elected, bringing the 2003 membership to 25. The newly formed organization made no claims of being "the best," although many of the members are readily recognized as being among the elite in the carving community. The combined membership has garnered several hundred first place ribbons, including many "Best-of-Show", in carving competitions across the nation; they have published over 80 books on wood carving; and they regularly teach wood carving seminars throughout the United States and Canada.

Purpose
 To promote and elevate the appreciation of caricature woodcarving within both the wood carving community and the general public.
 To provide an environment that will encourage growth in skill, creativity, and excellence among its members and the carving public.

Leadership
President — Dave Stetson
President-Elect — Tom Brown
Secretary — Randy Landen
Treasurer — Dennis Thornton

Membership

Current members
 David Boone
 Tom Brown
 Harold Enlow
 Gary Falin
 Gene Fuller
 Eldon Humphreys
 Marv Kaisersatt
 Randy Landen
 Pete LeClair
 Keith Morrill
 Vic Otto
 Steve Prescott
 Doug Raine
 David Sabol
 Harley Schmitgen
 Joe Schumacher
 Gerald Sears
 Dave Stetson
 Dennis Thornton
 Bob Travis
 Jack Williams
 Tom Wolfe
 Joe You
 Dwayne Gosnell

Emeritus members
 Gary Batte
 Phil Bishop
 Desiree Hajny
 Will Hayden
 Peter Ortel
 Jack Price
 Harley Refsal
 Cleve Taylor
 Rich Wetherbee

Members honorarius
 Claude Bolton
 Dave Dunham
 Tex Haase
 Dave Rasmussen

References
 
 http://www.cca-carvers.org/

Woodcarving